Lao Ai (died 238 BCE) was an imposter eunuch and official of the State of Qin during the late Warring States period. Allegedly falsifying his castration in order to gain entry into the court of Qin, he became the favorite of Queen Dowager Zhao, the mother of Qin Shi Huang, later the First Emperor of China. He was enfeoffed as Marquis of Changxin (長信侯). After a conspiracy to incite rebellion was uncovered, he was executed by Qin Shi Huang.

Since the conspiracy and downfall of Lao Ai, his sexual misdeeds have become a fixture in the traditional moralizing discourse of intellectuals in imperial China, and his very surname and style name, which meant "lustful misdeed" in Old Chinese, has become a byword for "fornicators" in the classical Chinese language.

Biography
According to Sima Qian's Records of the Grand Historian, Lao Ai had a giant penis, being of such size that it could be used as an axle for a wooden carriage. This ability drew the attention of Lü Buwei, who was having an affair with Queen Dowager Zhao, mother to King Zheng of Qin (later Qin Shi Huang), and Lü plotted to make use of Lao's sexual prowess to ingratiate himself with the Queen Dowager.

During the formative years of King Zheng's reign, Lü Buwei ended his affair with the Queen Dowager and gave Lao Ai to her. Lü and the Queen organised a false castration in order to facilitate Lao Ai's admission to the Queen's palace as a eunuch.

After moving to the provisional capital Yong, Lao Ai fathered two children by the queen and gave himself the diminutive "false father". Lao Ai profited from his status and gathered over one thousand servants and followers.

In 238 BCE, following the royal proclamation announcing Lao Ai's status as an imposter lover consorting with the Queen Dowager, with plans to secretly father the next king, Lao Ai was investigated. During this time, he attempted a coup d'état with a small number of followers, using the Queen Dowager's seal to gain legitimacy.

Without popular support, military training, numbers, or sufficient organisation, Lao Ai's followers were quickly defeated. Lao Ai was punished by being dismembered and torn apart by five horses and the Queen Dowager was imprisoned in her palace and her two sons were killed. Followers were exiled to the former state of Shu.

Historicity
The historicity of Lao Ai has been doubted by modern historians, who consider that Confucian ideologues, who were in favor with the Han court during the composition of the Records of the Grand Historian, had the ulterior motive of portraying Qin Shi Huang, a foe of Confucians who had ordered their mass execution in 212 BCE, as a bastard. Supporters of this theory point out that Lao Ai's name appears etymologically fanciful: the characters used to write Lao Ai literally mean "lustful misdeed" in Old Chinese, and that his defining characteristic, his large penis (in Chinese ), can also be taken to mean "great conspiracy". Given that Sima Qian, author of the historical work that canonized this traditional account of Lao Ai, was himself subject to the punishment of castration some years before, skeptically minded historians believe that the story of Lao Ai is meant to be understood allegorically, as a "personified phallus" who represented "a basic threat to the transmission of the imperial bloodline and hence the purity of the 'united cosmos.'"

The story of Lao Ai was also told by Yu Xiao-yu, the 16th-century author of Chronicles of Many States During the Age of Spring and Fall, the length of which was nearly tripled by Fung Lung Mong (1574–1646), after which the book was then known as Stories of East Chou's Many States.

In popular culture
In Manga Kingdom, he was given to Lady Zhao as Lü Buwei's "gift" to her. He joined the coup, as King of Ai, their own "state" and tried to eliminate Qin, reluctantly leading the bloodthirsty Qin traitor Fan Wuji and other generals. He was caught in the disastrous retreat and executed in the aftermath.

Notes

References

Bibliography

Year of birth unknown
238 BC deaths
People executed by dismemberment
Qin state people
3rd-century BC Chinese people